Lonely Woman may refer to:
"Lonely Woman" (composition), a 1959 jazz composition by Ornette Coleman
Lonely Woman (album), a 1962 album by the Modern Jazz Quartet featuring the above composition
"Lonely Woman" (Stan Kenton song), 1948
"Lonely Woman", a jazz composition by Horace Silver from the 1965 album Song for My Father
"Lonely Woman", a 2005 song by Southern All Stars
Lonely Women, an American radio soap opera during World War II
A Lonely Woman, a 1981 Polish drama film